Traviss is a surname. Notable people with the surname include:

Karen Traviss, British science fiction author
Reg Traviss (born 1977), British film director and writer

See also
Travers (surname)
Travis (surname)

References

English-language surnames
Surnames of French origin